Zingeria is a genus of Asian and European plants in the grass family. Their native range covers the Black Sea and eastern Mediterranean regions from Romania to Kazakhstan.

Zingeria was named in honour of Vasily Jakovlevich Zinger (1836–1907), Russian mathematician, botanist and philosopher.

 Species
 Zingeria biebersteiniana (Claus) P.A.Smirn. - Crimea, southern European Russia, northern and southern Caucasus, Turkey, Kazakhstan, Iran, Iraq, Syria, Jordan
 Zingeria kochii (Mez) Tzvelev - southern Caucasus
 Zingeria pisidica (Boiss.) Tutin  - Romania, Turkey, southern Caucasus
 Zingeria trichopoda (Boiss.) P.A.Smirn. - southern Caucasus, Turkey, Iran, Iraq, Syria, Lebanon, possibly Saudi Arabia
 Zingeria verticillata (Boiss. & Bal.) Chrtek - Turkey

References

External links
 Grassbase - The World Online Grass Flora

Pooideae
Poaceae genera